Whiskeytown Lake is a reservoir in Shasta County in northwestern California, United States, about  west of Redding. The lake is in the Whiskeytown Unit of the Whiskeytown-Shasta-Trinity National Recreation Area.

Additional water comes from Lewiston Reservoir, supplied by the Trinity River, via the Clear Creek Tunnel, which comes from the bottom of Lewiston Lake.

The California Office of Environmental Health Hazard Assessment has issued a safe eating advisory for any fish caught in the Whiskeytown Lake due to elevated levels of mercury.

Recreation
There are recreational activities available at the lake, including camping, swimming, boating, water skiing and fishing. However, personal water craft have been banned from the lake.  Fishing opportunities include rainbow and German brown trout; largemouth, smallmouth, and spotted bass; and kokanee salmon.

Whiskeytown is favored by locals because of the  visibility of its waters, and wildlife that surround the lake.  There are numerous breeding pairs of bald eagles that nest on the lake's shores.  Sharing the habitat are black bears, mountain lions, blacktail deer, turtles and raccoons, among other wildlife.  It is mandated that the lake be at full capacity by Memorial Day, and remain full until Labor Day.

Whiskeytown Dam

It is owned and operated by the United States Bureau of Reclamation. Its purpose is to provide flood control, water for irrigation, and electricity generation.

Powerhouse
Before entering the lake, the water generates hydroelectricity at the 154 MW Judge Francis Carr Powerhouse. Whiskey Creek also empties into the lake. A large portion of the lake's water leaves through the Spring Creek Tunnel, which delivers the water to the 180-MW Spring Creek Powerhouse, whose tailrace empties into Keswick Reservoir. The 117-MW Keswick Powerhouse at Keswick Dam empties into the Sacramento River. Most of the electricity produced by the three powerhouses supplies Redding's municipal electric utility, as well as other municipal electric utilities in Northern California, with the remainder offered into the California Independent System Operator's markets for purchase by load-serving entities throughout the state.

Climate 
Whiskeytown Reservoir is one of several places in northern California to register a temperature of 120 °F or above (some others include Red Bluff and Orland).

See also

List of dams and reservoirs in California
List of lakes in California
List of largest reservoirs of California
Carr Fire a major wildfire than burned all the way around the lake

References
Columbia Gazetteer of North America
United States Bureau of Reclamation

External links

Whiskeytownlake.com

Whiskeytown National Recreation Area (U.S. National Park Service)

Reservoirs in Shasta County, California
Reservoirs and dams in National Park Service units
National Park Service areas in California
Central Valley Project
Reservoirs in California
Reservoirs in Northern California